Kellerville is an unincorporated community in Harbison Township, Dubois County, in the U.S. state of Indiana.

History
Kellerville was named for its founder, John Keller. An old variant name of the community was called Ludlow.

A post office was established under the name Ludlow in 1851, was renamed Kellerville in 1870, and remained in operation until it was discontinued in 1931.

Geography

References

Unincorporated communities in Dubois County, Indiana
Unincorporated communities in Indiana
Jasper, Indiana micropolitan area